Eccellenza Trentino-Alto Adige/Südtirol is the regional Eccellenza football division for clubs in the northern Italian region of Trentino-Alto Adige/Südtirol, Italy. It is competed amongst 16 teams, in one group. The winners of the Groups are promoted to Serie D. The club who finishes second also have the chance to gain promotion, they are entered into a national play-off which consists of two rounds.

Champions
Here are the past champions of the Trentino-Alto Adige/Südtirol Eccellenza, organised into their respective seasons.

1991–92 Passirio Merano
1992–93 Rovereto
1993–94 Arco
1994–95 Settaurense
1995–96 Arco
1996–97 Südtirol
1997–98 Rovereto	
1998–99 Mezzocorona
1999–2000 Condinese
2000–01 Rovereto
2001–02 Mezzocorona											
2002–03 Bolzano
2003–04 Arco
2004–05 Vallagarina
2005–06 Porfido Albiano 				
2006–07 Alta Vallagarina
2007–08 Bolzano
2008–09 Porfido Albiano
2009–10 Trento
2010–11 St. Georgen 
2011–12 Fersina Perginese
2012–13 Dro
2013–14 Mori Santo Stefano
2014–15 Levico Terme
2015–16 Virtus Bolzano
2016–17 Trento
2017–18 Virtus Bolzano
2018–19 Dro
2019–20 Trento
2020–21 Levico
2021–22 Virtus Bolzano

References

External links
Some Club Histories In the League

 

Sport in Trentino-Alto Adige/Südtirol
Tren
Football clubs in Italy
Association football clubs established in 1991
1991 establishments in Italy
Sports leagues established in 1991